Oleksandr Mykolaiovych Marchenko (born 12 January 1968 in Kherson) is a Ukrainian rower.
He and his partner Vasil Yakusha won the bronze medal for the Soviet Union in the double sculls competition at the 1988 Summer Olympics.

References 
 
 

1968 births
Living people
Ukrainian male rowers
Sportspeople from Kherson
Rowers at the 1988 Summer Olympics
Rowers at the 1996 Summer Olympics
Rowers at the 2000 Summer Olympics
Olympic bronze medalists for the Soviet Union
Olympic rowers of the Soviet Union
Olympic rowers of Ukraine
Olympic medalists in rowing
World Rowing Championships medalists for Ukraine
Medalists at the 1988 Summer Olympics
Soviet male rowers